The Employee Polygraph Protection Act of 1988 (EPPA) is a United States federal law that generally prevents employers from using polygraph (lie detector) tests, either for pre-employment screening or during the course of employment, with certain exemptions.

Under EPPA, most private employers may not require or request any employee or job applicant to take a lie detector test, or discharge, discipline, or discriminate against anybody for refusing to take a test or for exercising other rights under the act. However, the act does permit polygraph tests to be administered to certain applicants for job with security firms (such as armored car, alarm, and guard companies) and of pharmaceutical manufacturers, distributors, and dispensers. The law does not cover federal, state, and local government agencies.

In addition, employers are required to display a poster in the workplace explaining the EPPA for their employees.

External links
U.S. Department of Labor EPPA page
Text of the Employee Polygraph Protection Act - 29 U.S. Code Chapter 22
Federal EPPA Labor Law Poster

1988 in law
100th United States Congress
United States federal labor legislation
United States federal legislation articles without infoboxes
United States polygraphy law
1988 in labor relations